Carrshield is a village in Northumberland, in England. It is situated in the Pennines approximately between Penrith and Hexham.
It is a small village with an old school building situated in the centre of the village. The school was built in 1851 but is no longer a working school and is now three houses.

Carrshield is surrounded by beautiful fell ground and is littered with old disused mines. Remnants of the old stone works where the lead was mined are still able to be seen next to the river. There are no shops in Carrshield; the Post Office closed down because of lack of business.

Carrshield has numerous farms surrounding it, including a Stud and Rehabilitation Centre for horses. It also has a Methodist Chapel.

The village name is often misspelt on older maps (even the county website) as 'Carr Shield' but is now correct on OS maps.

References

External links

Northumberland Communities (Accessed: 27 November 2008)

Villages in Northumberland